Venus Makes Trouble is a 1937 American comedy film directed by Gordon Wiles and starring James Dunn, Patricia Ellis and Astrid Allwyn. It was produced and distributed by Columbia Pictures as a second feature.

Synopsis
The plot revolves around the schemes of fast-talking publicity man Buzz Martin, from dropping fake money from an airplane, to betting on turtle races, to selling swampland for real estate, which eventually lands him in front of a grand jury.

Cast 

 James Dunn as Buzz Martin
 Patricia Ellis as Kay Horner
 Gene Morgan as Happy Hinkle
 Astrid Allwyn as Iris Randall
 Thurston Hall as Harlan Darrow
 Beatrice Curtis as Ruth Milner
 Donald Kirke as Lon Stanton
 Tom Chatterton as Kenneth Rowland
 Howard C. Hickman as Howard Clark
 Spencer Charters as Joel Willard
 Charles Lane as District Attorney
 Murdock MacQuarrie (uncredited)

External links 
 imdb page
 Turner Classic Movies page

1937 films
Columbia Pictures films
Films directed by Gordon Wiles
1937 comedy films
American comedy films
American black-and-white films
1930s American films